General elections were held in Costa Rica on 8 February 1948. Otilio Ulate Blanco of the National Union Party won the presidential election with 55.3% of the vote, although the elections were deemed fraudulent by members of the governing National Republican Party (who supported Rafael Calderón) and annulled by Congress, leading to the six-week Costa Rican Civil War later that year. Following the war, the results of the parliamentary election were also annulled. Voter turnout was 43.8% in the vice-presidential election and 49.2%.

After the Civil War, José Figueres Ferrer became President at the head of a provisional junta that ruled for 18 months before handing power over to Ulate Blanco.

Campaign
In 1944, four days after the elections were over while celebrating the triumph of Teodoro Picado, Calderón's candidacy was announced for the next elections.

The main opposition parties; the Democratic Party, the National Union Party and the Social Democratic Party held a convention to choose a single candidate. The pre-candidates were Fernando Castro Cervantes (Democrat), Otilio Ulate Blanco (Unionist) and José Figueres Ferrer (Social-Democrat). Figueres was eliminated in the first round and with his support, Ulate won in the second. Figueres was named chief of action and Mario Echandi was secretary general of the coalition, While Calderón was named candidate on March 23, 1947 at the Republican Convention.

The National Electoral Tribunal was created for the first time in charge of supervising the elections so that it was not the government (as it was until then) that regulated them and thus appeased the moods that accused the government of interfering in favor of the official candidate. Even so, the work of the TNE was limited.

The situation was tremendously tense between government and opposition. The youth of the National Opposition Coalition violently confronted the Communist Brigades during the debate on the budgets of the electoral bodies in the Congress.

The opposition insisted that it would not repeal the social reforms, while the "caldero-communists" affirmed that they must win once more to consolidate them permanently and that the opposition would abolish them after winning.

The tension increased and even groups of the opposition became subversive. The Cartago Province, one of the strongholds of the opposition, began a general strike and a series of social uprisings that forced Picado to remove the governor (who was appointed by the president) and other local rulers, although this did not calm the spirits. In addition, the government faced a large national strike known as the "arms-down strike" and the clashes left many dead.

Aftermath
On February 28, 1948 the National Electoral Tribunal issued a ruling on the elections with two opinions, the majority signed by magistrates Gerardo Guzmán and José María Vargas, and the minority signed by magistrate Max Koberg. The majority found inconsistencies in the count and nullity of the padron: 14,000 votes exceeded the voters who had participated in theory and who gave the win to Ulate, inconsistency whereby the elections were canceled. The minority one does not. The Constitutional Congress heard both opinions generated an intense debate between the Calderonistas and communists deputies who advocated in favor of annulling the elections and the opposition deputies.

The Congress did not annul the parliamentary elections where the ruling coalition had been favored, even though the irregularities denounced in the presidential elections applied to both. In any case, this cancellation was the trigger for the Costa Rican Civil War or "48 War". After which the "Founding Junta of the Second Republic" presided over by Figueres would ruled de facto for 18 months, then giving the presidency to Otilio Ulate in 1949.

Results

President

References

1948 elections in Central America
1948 in Costa Rica
Elections in Costa Rica
Annulled elections